Brian Rooney (born 2 November 1972) is a Northern Irish-born Australian actor with film, television and stage credits. He is best known for his childhood television performances, in particular the part of Michael Winters in G.P.. He appeared in the children's television productions of The Ferals as Leonard, and Spellbinder as Alex Katsonis.

Career
Rooney first appeared on Australian Television on Network Channel 10 in Adelaide, South Australia on the Grundy Television show, Pot Luck. He sang Take My Breath Away, but lost to Roy Handley, who performed the Acker Bilk song, Stranger on the Shore. Both Handley and Rooney were told by the show's celebrity judge, Adelaide based TV and radio personality Anne Wills, that they should try acting as they had the "face for television". Consequently, Rooney auditioned with the Australian Broadcasting Corporation for a role on G.P..

Rooney began his career playing the street-wise urchin Gavroche in the Australian stage production of Les Misérables. Soon after, he went on to play the character Tommy Franco, alongside Dolph Lundgren and Louis Gossett Jr., in the 1989 feature film The Punisher.

As a child actor, Rooney became best known on Australian television during the early 1990s for his long-running role of Michael Winters in the ABC-TV series G.P., and as Brendan Maloney in the 1991 miniseries Brides of Christ. He has appeared in a number of television films including The Rogue Stallion (1990), The Phantom Horseman (1991), and Pirates Island (1991).

More recently Rooney played the role of Cedric in the 2001 children's television series Escape of the Artful Dodger. In 2010, he guest starred as the character Jones in Rescue: Special Ops (Season 2, Episode 12).

Filmography

Film

Television

References

External links

1972 births
Australian male child actors
Australian male film actors
Australian male stage actors
Australian male television actors
Living people
Male child actors from Northern Ireland
Male film actors from Northern Ireland
Male stage actors from Northern Ireland
Male television actors from Northern Ireland